Kaadhal Kavithai is a 1998 Indian Tamil-language romance film directed by Agathiyan and produced by Murali Manohar. The film stars Prashanth and Isha Koppikar, while Kasthuri, Manivannan and Srividya play other supporting characters. The film had music composed by Ilaiyaraaja, while duo Lancy-Mohan and Ravi Yadav handled the editing and cinematography respectively.

The storyline revolves around a classical dancer who, while touring Europe, visits Princess Diana's memorial at Althorp. Browsing through the various messages left by the public, she comes across a poetic, poignant epistle in Tamil that captivates her and impels her to scribble a response. While returning a few days later, she finds the author of that note has left another one, prompting her to begin to search for the author. After opening on 25 December 1998, the film went on to gain success critically and became a commercially successful venture.

Plot
Vishwa (Prashanth) spends his time hanging out with Anandham (Charlie) to avoid his mother (Ambika), who always quarrels with his dad (Manivannan). To find peace, he plays tricks on others. Among the victims is Jothi (Isha Koppikar).  The story moves to London, where Vishva visits Princess Diana's grave and leaves a beautiful poem behind. At the same time, Jothi too visits the grave and leaves a note after reading the poem. Then begins a warm relationship between Jothi and Vishwa without seeing each other. Whether the two are united form the rest of the story.

Cast

Production
After the success of Shankar's 1998 romantic film Jeans, the co-producer Ashok Amritraj agreed to work with actor Prashanth again in his next film and thus signed on to finance a film to be directed by Agathiyan. The film was initially titled Adhisayam (Wonder) and shooting began in Tamil Nadu in August 1998. The film went through a change of title to Kaadhal Kavithai, reminiscent of Agathiyan's yesteryear film Kadhal Kottai and Amritraj sold the project to Sunanda Murali Manohar of Cee I TV Limited.

Isha Koppikar made her debut as an actor with this film, despite signing on to appear in K. S. Ravi's En Swasa Kaatre before Kaadhal Kavithai. The team had earlier approached Aishwarya Rai to be a part of the film, though she did not accept the offer. Monal auditioned for the film, but did not make the final cast. Raju Sundaram choreographed a belly dance song shot in Rajasthan featuring actress Kasthuri. Part of the film is shot in London, with locations including near the River Thames, the Houses of Parliament, Piccadilly Circus and Althorp, where the memorial to Princess Diana was located.

Release
A critic from Indolink.com gave the film a positive review mentioning that Kaadhal Kavithai "is handled neatly and that Agathian manages well with dialogues and a fresh mix of characters", describing it as "the must see movie of the year". A critic from Tamil Movie Cafe also gave the film a positive review, praising the director's work. The Deccan Herald mentioned that the film is "visually a delight, the songs and music are pleasant, especially when they harmonise with the locations, which they don’t always." The reviewer adds that "Prashanth is alright though he seems a little narcissistic, you always feel that he’s looking at a mirror someone’s holding up. The heroine is new, and not unpleasant. Srividya is wasted, though brightening." A critic from The New Indian Express wrote "Prashanth and Isha (for whom this is the second film) perform well and Prashanth, especially after his Jeans has matured as an actor".

Prashanth with Kaadhal Kavithai capped off a hat-trick of hit films in 1998 after the successes of Shankar's Jeans and Ravichandran's Kannedhirey Thondrinal. Isha Koppikar won plaudits from critics for her performance with Rediff.com stating that with her "strong screen presence, and acting skills that belie her newbie status, she could be the latest to storm the TN industry". The film won her further offers and Vijay signed her on for his next Nenjinile after seeing her performance in Kaadhal Kavithai. She went on to win the Filmfare Award for Best Female Debut in 1998.

Soundtrack

The soundtrack of the film was composed by Ilaiyaraaja, his only collaboration with Agathian, was well received by the audience and became one of the most sold albums in 1998.

References

External links
 

1990s Tamil-language films
1998 films
1998 romantic drama films
Films directed by Agathiyan
Films scored by Ilaiyaraaja
Films set in Chennai
Films set in London
Films shot in Chennai
Films shot in London
Films shot in Morocco
Indian romantic drama films